Pradeshika Varthakal is a 1989 Indian Malayalam-language comedy film directed by Kamal and produced by S. Sivaprasad, the film stars Jayaram, Parvathy, Jagathy Sreekumar and Innocent, with a film score composed by Johnson.

Plot
The movie opens with Kallan Krishnan and Kallan Kochappy, two thieves being driven out of the village.
Keshavunni, a villager opens a new film theatre in his village. After keeping Jabbar as his operator, Keshavunni begins work. The first film is attended by almost the entire village, including Keshavunni's father Kunjambu Nair, Fr. Antony Paramel and Velichappadu. After a mix-up in films, they face criticicsm from the entire crowd. Keshavunni continues his business accompanied by his friend Thankachen, a bar owner. Keshavunni falls in love with Malika, a girl in his village, and convinces her to watch a film with him. They get discovered by the people in the village and this causes a huge ruckus. On the day of the marriage, Kallan Krishnan and Kallan Kochappi come back to the village after becoming rich. Krishnan doesn't agree to let his daughter Mallika marry Keshavanunni. Both Kallans move to a big house with their families. Mallika is very unhappy because of her cancelled marriage. Thankachan's toddy shop gets shut down by anti alcohol activists.  Eventually, both Kallans fight over her marriage and they split up, ending their friendship and move to two different homes. Both of them stand for elections and spend money for winning. The villagers start fighting with each other about the elections. Mallika finds that both Kallans planned all this deliberately to make the villagers fight and kill each other with communal riots. She informs Keshu and friends. On the day of election results, both Velichappadu and Father announce that the Devi statue from temple and the golden cross from the church are stolen. Both the Kallans are chased out of the village for stealing. Keshu and Mallika get married and Life returns to normal for the villagers.

Cast

Jayaram as Keshavanunni
Parvathy as Mallika
Jagathy Sreekumar as Thankachen
Innocent as Kunjambu Nair
Janardhanan as Kallan Krishnan
Siddique as Damodaran
Vijayaraghavan as Achankunju
Oduvil Unnikrishnan as Fr. Antony Paramel
Sankaradi as Mangalam Ji
Mamukkoya as Jabbar
Kuthiravattam Pappu as Velichappadu
C. I. Paul as Kallan Kochappi
Mala Aravindan as Vishwambaran
K. P. A. C. Lalitha as Karthiyaniamma
Philomina as Naniamma
Valsala Menon as Aleykutty

Soundtrack
The music was composed by Johnson.

References

External links
  
 

1989 films
1980s Malayalam-language films
Films directed by Kamal (director)
Films with screenplays by Ranjith